Hala Podpromie im. Jana Strzelczyka is an indoor arena based in Rzeszów, Poland.

External links
 Official website 

Indoor arenas in Poland
Volleyball venues in Poland
Buildings and structures in Rzeszów
Boxing venues in Poland
Mixed martial arts venues in Poland